Adam Hertz is an American politician. From 2012 to 2015, he served as a nonpartisan member of the Missoula City Council, where he represented Ward 2. From 2017 to 2018, he served as a Republican member of the Montana House of Representatives, where he represented District 96, including parts of Missoula, Montana. He lost reelection to Tom Winter in 2018.

References

Living people
People from Missoula, Montana
Republican Party members of the Montana House of Representatives
Year of birth missing (living people)
21st-century American politicians